Yevgeny Viktorovich Belousov (September 10, 1964,   Zhikhar — June 2, 1997, Moscow), better known as Zhenya Belousov was a Soviet and Ukrainian pop singer, popular in the late 1980s — early 1990s. His best-known hits include   My Blue-Eyed Girl,  Night Taxi, Alyoshka, Devchonka-Devchonochka, Evening-Evening, Hair Cloud, Golden Domes, Short Summer, Dunya-Dunyasha, In the Evening on a Bench.

Biography 
Yevgeny Viktorovich Belousov was born on September 10, 1964 in the village of Zhikhar,  Kharkiv Oblast.

He graduated from vocational school No 1 as mechanic-repairman and later studied at the Kursk Music College, learning bass guitar. He was not conscripted to the army due to heavy concussion he suffered in a car crash as a schoolboy.

In the mid-1980s Bari Alibasov saw Belousov playing in a Kursk restaurant and invited him to join his band Integral as a singing bassist. In 1987 he started a solo career and enjoyed success with a series of hits, collected in three studio albums, My Blue-Eyed Girl (1988),  Night Taxi (1990) and Devchonka-Devchonochka (1993).

Starting with 1993, Belousov's health started to deteriorate and his popularity nose-dived. His stint as a distillery businessman in Ryazan proved to be a failure and he was accused of tax evasion. In March 1997, he was taken to the Sklifosovsky Institute with acute pancreatitis. A month later he suffered a stroke (earlier head injuries and alcohol abuse cited as possible causes) and underwent a brain surgery.

On 2 June 1997 Belousov died at the Sklifosovsky hospital, and was interred in the Kuntsevo Cemetery.

References

External links
 Сайт «Памяти Евгения Белоусова»
   Женя Белоусов оставил дочери квартиру, а сыну — куртку

1964 births
1997 deaths
People from Kharkiv Oblast
Soviet male singers
Soviet pop singers
Russian pop singers
Burials at Kuntsevo Cemetery
20th-century Russian male singers
20th-century Russian singers